"We Just Disagree" is a song recorded by English singer-guitarist Dave Mason, written by Marko Perko and Jim Krueger.

Dave Mason version
Released in August 1977 as the second single from the album Let It Flow, the ballad featured Krueger's 12-string guitar prominently; he also sang the harmony above Mason's lead vocal. It reached number 12 on the Billboard Hot 100 in 1977.

Billy Dean version

"We Just Disagree" was covered in 1993 by American country music singer Billy Dean. It was released in November 1993 as the fourth and final single from his album Fire in the Dark. It was a Top Ten hit on the country music charts, peaking at number 9.

Music video
The music video was directed by Marius Penczner and premiered in early 1994.

Chart performance

Year-end charts

Other cover versions

Bob Dylan covered the song on his Fall 1980 tour.  A rehearsal of the song was released on the deluxe edition of Springtime in New York.
Home Free covered the song on their 2017 album Timeless.

References

1977 singles
1993 singles
Dave Mason songs
Billy Dean songs
Song recordings produced by Jimmy Bowen
Columbia Records singles
Liberty Records singles
1977 songs
Song recordings produced by Ron Nevison